Rohit Sharma is an Indian film composer, most famously known for being the music director of the film The Kashmir Files. His film composing career began during the early 2010s when he composed the song 'Naham Janami' which was featured in the critically acclaimed  film Ship Of Theseus. Since then, he has composed music for films such as Buddha in a Traffic Jam (2016), Anaarkali of Aarah (2017), The Tashkent Files (2019), The Kashmir Files (2022) and more. In the OTT space, Rohit Sharma has worked on prominent titles such as Aspirants by The Viral Fever and Maharani 2 among others.http://Vishaloppo.blogspot.com

Early life
Rohit Sharma was born in New Delhi, India and holds a bachelor's degree in Engineering from Delhi College Of Engineering in 1996. Since childhood, he had a natural passion and talent for music and taught himself to play the Indian classical flute. Also a gifted singer, he excelled in music & singing competitions all through school and college, bagging multiple awards as a result. At the age of 17, he sought formal education from Pt. Harshwardhan for Classical Flute. Simultaneously, he trained himself in Western Classical Piano from the Delhi School of Music. In the year 2000, he quit his job to become a professional music composer in Mumbai, India.

Career
His music career began with composing a number of jingles and music for TVCs, with agencies such as Ogilvy and Mather, Rediffusion Y&R, JWT, Mudra Communications and production companies namely Percept Pictures, Situations, Kiss Films, Ishana Movies and more.  In 2009, he kickstarted his film composing career by composing and arranging the song 'Naham Janami' for the feature film Ship of Theseus. Further, he created the score for Buddha In A Traffic Jam in 2011. These two films were released in 2013 and 2016 respectively. While he earned notable recognition for his track in Ship of Theseus, Buddha In A Traffic Jam got him widespread critical acclaim for having seventeen tracks that included music genres as varied as Tribal Blues, Folk Rock and Rock opera to Blues and Jazz. The soundtracks also included two Nazms namely "Bekaar Kutte" and "Chand Roz", written by Faiz Ahmad Faiz, a revolutionary poet from Pakistan. He continued to compose music for several feature films during this period. In 2016, he scored the music for Anaarkali of Aarah, where he got the chance to experiment with folk music and folk songs from Bihar. This won him the Best Music Director award in the 8th Jagran Film Festival.  In 2017, he created the background score for The Holy Fish and in 2019, he once again received widespread recognition when he composed all tracks of the film The Tashkent Files. His film composing career reached new heights when he composed the background score (9 themes) for The Kashmir Files. The soundtrack for this film was created by recording an orchestra in Budapest, and the longstanding, deep impact of this music won him laurels. Since then, he has composed music for a number of films such as Shadow of Othello and Dhatura which are yet to release.

Rohit Sharma entered the OTT space in 2018 with composing three songs for the Indian web series Yeh Meri Family by The Viral Fever. In 2021, he composed four songs for the award winning series Aspirants, again by TVF (The Viral Fever) including lending his own voice to one track viz. "Mohbhang". The series was nominated for the Best Original Soundtrack (Series) award in 2021 Filmfare OTT Awards and won the Best Music (Originals) Series award at IWM Digital Awards (2022). Rohit Sharma composed all songs for the series Maharani 2 in 2022, where he was lauded for implementing rustic, folk styles from Bihar (where the series is set) in the soundtracks, one of the praises being from renowned folk singer Padma Bhushan Sharda Sinha herself, who was the singer for one of the tracks of this series. In the same year, he also composed two tracks for the web series Flames - Season 3 by The Viral Fever.

Besides composing music for films & OTT, Rohit Sharma is also part of a band called Swaang.

Discography

Films

Web Shows (OTT)

Awards 
Best Music Director award in 8th Jagran Film Festival 2017 for the movie Anaarkali of Aarah.

Nominated as Best Original Soundtrack (Series) for Aspirants in 2021 Filmfare OTT Awards.

Best Music (Originals) Series for Aspirants in IWM Digital Awards (2022).

References

External links
 
 Q & A With Rohit Sharma
 Ship of Theseus music dir Rohit Sharma's extended interview

Living people
Musicians from Mumbai
Hindi film score composers
Indian male film score composers
Year of birth missing (living people)